Chanda is a 2007 Kannada-language film directed by S. Narayan, produced by Smt. Bhagyavathi and starred Duniya Vijay and Shubha Punja. The film was in the news when Duniya Vijay decided not to dub for the film. The film was a box office success.

Cast
Duniya Vijay as Kariya
Shubha Poonja as Swapna 
Sundar Raj
Komal
Master Rakesh
Somanna Jaadar
Shobha Raghavendra

Soundtrack

Release
Sify gave a positive review.

References

2000s Kannada-language films
2007 films
Films directed by S. Narayan